Oak Lawn, also known as Burford House, is a historic home in Madison Heights, Amherst County, Virginia. Its original section was built around 1810, and enlarged around 1859. It is a two-story, three bay frame dwelling with weatherboard siding, four exterior end chimneys, and Federal and Greek Revival-style design elements. A late-19th century latticed well house is also on the property.

Oak Lawn was added to the National Register of Historic Places in 2008.

References

Houses in Amherst County, Virginia
Houses completed in 1857
Federal architecture in Virginia
Greek Revival houses in Virginia
Houses on the National Register of Historic Places in Virginia
National Register of Historic Places in Amherst County, Virginia
1810 establishments in Virginia